USS S. T. Co. No. 2 (SP-267) was a United States Navy tug, dispatch boat, and minesweeper in commission from 1917 to 1919.

S. T. Co. No. 2 was built as a commercial steam screw tug of the same name in 1898 by Charles Hillman at Philadelphia, Pennsylvania. The U.S. Navy acquired her under charter from her owner, the Standard Transportation Company, on 24 September 1917 for World War I service. She was commissioned on 27 September 1917 as USS S. T. Co. No. 2 (SP-267).

Assigned to the 5th Naval District, S. T. Co. No. 2 operated in the Virginia Capes area and Chesapeake Bay for the remainder of World War I, serving as a tug, dispatch vessel, and minesweeper.

After the war, S. T. Co. No. 2 was returned to Standard Transportation on 23 June 1919.

References

NavSource Online: Section Patrol Craft Photo Archive S. T. Co. No. 2 (SP 267)

Minesweepers of the United States Navy
Tugs of the United States Navy
World War I minesweepers of the United States
World War I auxiliary ships of the United States
Dispatch boats of the United States Navy
Ships built in Philadelphia
1898 ships